The 60th World Science Fiction Convention (Worldcon), also known as ConJose, was held on 29 August–2 September 2002 at the McEnery Convention Center, the Fairmont San Jose, and the Hilton San Jose & Towers in San Jose, California, United States.

The convention was co-chaired by Tom Whitmore and Kevin Standlee and organized under the auspices of San Francisco Science Fiction Conventions.

Participants

Guests of Honor 

 Vernor Vinge (writer)
 David Cherry (artist)
 Jan and Bjo Trimble (fans)
 Ferdinand Feghoot (imaginary)
 Tad Williams (toastmaster)

Other program participants

Special appearance 

Patrick Stewart made a special appearance at ConJose. He talked about upcoming films Star Trek Nemesis and X-Men 2, as well as his experiences on Star Trek: The Next Generation.

Awards

2002 Hugo Awards 

 Best Novel: American Gods by Neil Gaiman
 Best Novella: "Fast Times at Fairmont High" by Vernor Vinge (The Collected Stories of Vernor Vinge)
 Best Novelette: "Hell Is the Absence of God" by Ted Chiang (Starlight 3)
 Best Short Story: "The Dog Said Bow-Wow" by Michael Swanwick (Asimov's 10-11/01)
 Best Related Book: The Art of Chesley Bonestell by Ron Miller & Frederick C. Durant III, with Melvin H. Schuetz
 Best Dramatic Presentation: The Lord of the Rings: The Fellowship of the Ring
 Best Professional Editor: Ellen Datlow
 Best Professional Artist: Michael Whelan
 Best Semiprozine: Locus, edited by Charles N. Brown
 Best Fanzine: Ansible, edited by Dave Langford
 Best Fan Writer: Dave Langford
 Best Fan Artist: Teddy Harvia
 Best Website: Locus Online, Mark R. Kelly editor/webmaster

Other awards 

 John W. Campbell Award for Best New Writer: Jo Walton

Future site selection 

Glasgow won the vote for the 65th World Science Fiction Convention to be held in 2005, as the only bid that filed.

Committee

Co-chairs 

 Tom Whitmore
 Kevin Standlee
 Vice Chair/Controller: Cindy Scott
 Vice Chair/Deliverables Manager: Craige Howlett

Division heads 

 Events: John Blaker
 Exhibits: Larry Smith
 Facilities: David Gallaher, Nancy Cobb
 Fairy Godfather: David W. Clark
 Hospitality: Geri Sullivan
 Member Services: Elaine Brennan
 Programming: Kathryn Daugherty
 Publications: Bob Daverin, Brenda Daverin
 Support Services: Tony Cratz

Bid 

 Kevin Standlee, bid chair

The "Coup" 

In late 2001 and early 2002, some members of the SFSFC board expressed dissatisfaction about the progress made to date by convention management. It was proposed that the board remove Tom Whitmore as convention chair. The board decided to compromise by naming Tom Whitmore and Kevin Standlee as co-chairs of the convention.

Notes 

At the Hugo Awards presentation, Arthur C. Clarke gave a speech via direct video link from his home in Sri Lanka.

There was a Goth dance as well as a rock and roll dance at the convention (they took place on different nights).

See also 

 Hugo Award
 Science fiction
 Speculative fiction
 World Science Fiction Society
 Worldcon

References

External links 

 Official site (archived)
 San Francisco Science Fiction Conventions

2002 conferences
2002 in California
2002 in the United States
21st century in San Jose, California
Culture of San Jose, California
Science fiction conventions in the United States
Worldcon